Federal Way Public Schools is a school district in King County, Washington covering all of Federal Way and portions of Kent, Des Moines, Auburn, and unincorporated census-designated places Lakeland North and Lakeland South, encompassing .

There are 37 schools in the district, consisting of 21 elementary schools, 2 K-8 schools, 6 middle schools, 4 high schools, 3 specialized schools, and one online school.

Federal Way Public Schools is the most diverse school district in Washington state, and the 5th most diverse in the nation. 

 The class of 2018 continued a six-year trend of increasing graduation rates, reaching 86.2 percent.  The classes of 2017 and 2018 had the highest graduate rate in the Road Map region.
 71 percent of high school students in the district have taken an advanced course. This is higher than average, and third highest in the Road Map region. 92 percent of students taking an advanced course are earning a passing grade.
 The class of 2021 and beyond is required to earn 24 hours of community service as a graduation requirement. 
 Since 2017, Federal Way Public Schools has hosted an annual STEM Exploration Night, with thousands of students and their families in attendance.  
 In 2018, Federal Way Public Schools launched Scholar Art in the City, an initiative that displays student art and writing in businesses and organizations across the city of Federal Way.  
 63 percent of students enrolled in a two or four year college program. 
 81 percent of scholars who attended a four-year postsecondary institution were continuously enrolled.

The current Superintendent is Dr. Danielle Pfeiffer. 

Between the 2002–2003 and 2003–2004 the school district transitioned from Junior High Schools to Middle Schools.

Governance
The Board of Directors for Federal Way Public Schools consists of five members who are elected by the voters of the entire school district. Each director must reside and be a registered voter, at the time of their election or appointment, in the geographical region, known as a Director District, they represent on the board. The Board also consists of two student representatives, selected by the Board of Directors. The length of the term is four years. Board meetings are generally held twice monthly. Currently, board meetings are typically scheduled for the second and fourth Tuesday of the month at 6:00 p.m., with some exceptions, at the Educational Service Center.

Schools

Elementary schools
Adelaide Elementary School
Brigadoon Elementary School
Camelot Elementary School
Enterprise Elementary School
Green Gables Elementary School
Lake Dolloff Elementary School
Lake Grove Elementary School
Lakeland Elementary School
Mark Twain Elementary School
Meredith Hill Elementary School
Mirror Lake Elementary School
Olympic View Elementary School
Panther Lake Elementary School
Rainier View Elementary School
Sherwood Forest Elementary School
Silver Lake Elementary School
Star Lake Elementary School
Sunnycrest Elementary School
Twin Lakes Elementary School
Valhalla Elementary School
Wildwood Elementary School

K-8 Schools 

Nautilus K-8 School
Woodmont K-8 School

Middle schools
Illahee Middle School
Kilo Middle School
Lakota Middle School
Sacajawea Middle School
Sequoyah Middle School
Evergreen Middle School

High schools
Decatur High School
Federal Way High School
Thomas Jefferson High School ("TJ")
Todd Beamer High School

Specialized Schools
 Open Doors at Truman Campus
Career Academy at Truman
Internet Academy (K-12)
Public Academy (6–10) ("FWPA")
TAF@Saghalie (6–12)

Censorship
On January 9, 2007, the Federal Way Public School District temporarily blocked its teachers from showing Vice President Al Gore's global warming documentary, An Inconvenient Truth, without presenting a "credible, legitimate opposing view."  The order was passed after Frosty Hardison, a Federal Way parent, complained about the movie's use in his daughter's class.  Hardison was quoted in the Seattle Post-Intelligencer citing Biblical predictions of the age and end of the world, and saying neither condones Al Gore's view points being taught within school. The Board cited its policies on the teaching of controversial issues, neither of which provide for a moratorium. On January 23, after two weeks of criticism in the local and national scene, the Board backtracked and repealed the moratorium, but still insisted that opposing views need to be considered.

References

External links

Map of district boundaries

Education in King County, Washington
Federal Way, Washington
School districts in Washington (state)
School districts established in 1929
1929 establishments in Washington (state)